The Kʼómoks or Kʼomoks, usually known in English as the Comox, are an indigenous group of Coast Salishan-speaking people in Comox, British Columbia and in Toba Inlet and the Malaspina Peninsula areas of the British Columbia mainland across Georgia Strait. They historically spoke the Komox language (Comox-Sliammon), and were divided in two main dialect and tribal groupings, which are known by academics as Island Comox and Mainland Comox.

The Island Comox of Vancouver Island now centered in the area of Courtenay-Comox, were historically the greatest and most powerful Kʼómoks group; both - Kʼómoks together with the neighboring Pentlatch (Puntletch / Puntledge) - were referring in their original language to their cultural collective as Sathloot, known to the Mainland Comox as the θaɬaθtuxʷ. After being conquered and politically dominated by southward moving warring Laich-kwil-tach (Ligwiłdaʼxw) (sometimes known as "Southern Kwakiutl") they refer today in their adopted Liqʼwala dialect of Kwakʼwala to themselves as Kʼómoks (Kwakʼwala-name: kwʼumuxws "plentiful"). Today the Island Comox have close political and family ties to the Weiwaikum (Wiwēkam) of the Campbell River Band located in and around the city of Campbell River (Wiwek̓a̱m) on the east coast of Vancouver Island, to the Weiwaikai (Wēqay̓i-Wiwēqay̓i) of the Cape Mudge Indian Band (We Wai Kai Nation) on Quadra Island, and to the Walitsima / Walitsum Band of Salmon River (also called Hahamatses or Salmon River Band), who now occupy territories that were formerly Sathloot (Kʼómoks and Pentlatch). Many of these Laich-kwil-tach Bands are of Sathloot descent (sometimes the Walitsima / Walitsum Band are considered ethnically Kʼómoks, which only have adopted the culture and language of Laich-kwil-tach). Today the original languages of both Sathloot groups are extinct: the Island Comox dialect or Qʼómox̣ʷs (Salhulhtxw / Saɬuɬtxʷ) and the Puntletch / Puntledge (Pənƛ̕áč) language are dropped in favor for the Liqʼwala dialect and later for English.

Those across the strait are known by academics as the Mainland Comox and are formed today of three groups (which were once one tribe sharing neighboring territories and fishing sides together):

 The Sliammon (Tlaʼamin or ɬaʔəmen)
 The Klahoose (ƛohos means "sculpin fish")
 The Homalco (Xwemalhkwu or Xoχmaɬku)

Governments
Modern-day Kʼómoks are organized in four band governments (by other listings five):
Kʼómoks First Nation (Vancouver Island, ethnically mostly Kʼómoks but cultural and by language Laich-kwil-tach)
Tla Aʼmin Nation (Powell River/Malaspina Peninsula)
Klahoose First Nation (Discovery Islands)
Homalco First Nation (Toba Inlet)
Qualicum First Nation (in Qualicum Bay on Vancouver Island, representing people of Pentlatch descent together with some Laich-kwil-tach)

Culture

The Kʼómoks First Nation is made up of the Pentlatch, Eʼiksan and Słułtxʷ tribes. The Pentlatch occupied the valley for thousands of years, leaving behind the Great Midden, buried strata of discarded sea shells, testifying to a love of shellfish that still prevails on the coast. The Eʼiksan moved south from the Campbell River area between 1830-35. The Sałułtxʷ (Kʼómoks) moved south from the area of Quadra Island in approximately 1850-55.

The Pentlatch peoples knew the European traders who explored their shores in search of sea otter pelts. Buccaneering Sir Francis Drake likely dropped by on his secret expedition in 1579. The equally intrepid explorer Captain James Cook circumnavigated Vancouver Island in 1778. Both English and Spanish ships explored and exploited the coast thereafter.

Language

Although the language is almost lost, there is a collective of people in the band trying to work on a language program to revitalize it. There are at least three dialects spoken, Coast Salish Pentlatch and ayajusem (Island Comox dialect), and Kwakʼwala. Kwakʼwala is the most common language used in the region, it was used during the fur-trading era, in ceremonies, between intermarriages, and has evolved into a more complex system over time. Pentlatch has become less common; Kʼomoks Ancestors are said to have spoken this dialect. Pentlactch is more specific to the Coast Salish Side of Kʼomoks. The Last Fluent speaker of Pentlatch Passed in 1940. Ayajusem or also known as Island Comox Dialect is spoken in more specific regions such as Sathloot, Sasitla, Leeksun, Xaxe, and Komokwe Peoples. The last fluent speaker died in the 1990s. Both Pentaltch and ayajusem are heavily evolved from Kwakʼwala influence, like grammar and certain words.

References 

 
Mid Vancouver Island
Sunshine Coast (British Columbia)